Robert Armstrong Yerburgh,  (17 January 1853 – 18 December 1916), was a British barrister and Conservative politician.

Early life
Yerburgh was the son of the Reverend Richard Yerburgh and Susan Higgin and had ten full brothers and sisters: Richard Eustre, Susan Edith, John Eardley, Oswald, Mary Florence, Edmond Rochfort, Rachel, Harry Beauchamp, Lucy Isabel, and Charlotte Elizabeth. By his father's second marriage in 1863 he had two half-sisters, Annie Constance and Mabel Stanley.  He was educated at Rossall School, Harrow School, and University College, Oxford.

Career
After Oxford, Yerburgh was called to the bar. In 1886 he was elected to the House of Commons for Chester, standing for the Unionists, a seat he lost in 1906, but he was elected again in 1910. He was intended for a peerage in 1916 but died in December of that year, before the patent had been completed, aged 63. He was also a Deputy Lieutenant for Lancashire and a Justice of the Peace for Kirkcudbrightshire.

Private life
In 1888 Yerburgh married Elma Amy, a daughter of Daniel Thwaites, and the couple lived at Billinge Scar, near Blackburn, before moving to Woodfold Hall. They had two sons. Their eldest son, Robert, also became a Conservative politician and was elevated to the peerage as Baron Alvingham in 1929. Elma Amy Yerburgh died in 1946.

Coat of Arms

Yerburgh’s armorial bearings were per pale argent and azure on a chevron between three chaplets all counterchanged an annulet for the difference and on an escutcheon of pretence the arms of Theaites namely ermine a cross engrailed sable fretty argent in the first and fourth quarter a chaplet of oak vert. The mantling is azure and argent. For a crest: on a wreath of the colours a falcon close or belled of the last preying upon a mallard proper.

The motto “who dares wins” was sometimes used alongside the arms described here.

Notes

References
Kidd, Charles, Williamson, David (editors). Debrett's Peerage and Baronetage (1990 edition). New York: St Martin's Press, 1990.

External links 
Yerburgh family history (1912)
 

1853 births
1916 deaths
People educated at Rossall School
Alumni of University College, Oxford
Conservative Party (UK) MPs for English constituencies
UK MPs 1886–1892
UK MPs 1892–1895
UK MPs 1895–1900
UK MPs 1900–1906
UK MPs 1910
UK MPs 1910–1918
Deputy Lieutenants of Lancashire
Scottish justices of the peace
People educated at Harrow School